Karmøy (locally called Karmøyne or Karmøynå) is an island in the northwestern part of Rogaland county, Norway.  The  island makes up the majority of the municipality of Karmøy, along with the islands of Feøy, some smaller surrounding islands, and part of the mainland south of the municipality of Haugesund.  It is the largest island in Rogaland county.  The island is separated from the mainland by the Karmsundet strait.  The Boknafjorden lies to the south and southeast of the island.  The Sirafjorden lies to the west, separating Karmøy from the islands of Utsira and Feøy.

The island of Karmøy is the location of the towns of Kopervik, Skudeneshavn, and Åkrehamn.  The island has a population of about 33,101 people (2014).  The island is connected to the mainland by the Karmsund Bridge in the north and the Karmøy Tunnel in the central part. Haugesund Airport, Karmøy is located on the island at the western terminus of the European route E134 highway.

See also
List of islands of Norway

References

Islands of Norway
Karmøy